A theory of everything is a hypothetical physical theory that would explain all known physical phenomena.

Theory of everything may also refer to:

Philosophy
 Theory of everything (philosophy), a hypothetical all-encompassing philosophical explanation of nature or reality
 A Theory of Everything, a book by Ken Wilber dealing with his "integral theory"

Film and television
 "The Theory of Everything" (CSI), an episode of CSI: Crime Scene Investigation
 The Theory of Everything (2006 film), a TV film 
 The Theory of Everything (2014 film), a biographical film about Stephen and Jane Hawking

Music
 Theory of Everything (album), 2010 album by Children Collide
 The Theory of Everything (Ayreon album), 2013
 The Theory of Everything (Life On Planet 9 album), 2014
 Theory of Everything, a series of tracks by electronic composer DJ-Nate, of which two are used as the background music of levels in the video game Geometry Dash

See also
Theory of Everything (podcast), a radio show and then podcast by Benjamen Walker
 Toe (disambiguation)